Liptornis is a genus of fossil birds of uncertain affinities. The type species is L. hesternus. It was described by Argentine palaeontologist Florentino Ameghino in 1894 from a large cervical vertebra from the Middle Miocene Santa Cruz Formation of Patagonia. At the time, it was referred to the Pelecanidae, though this is questionable. In his 1933 palaeornithological review, Lambrecht referred it only to the superfamily Sulides without placing it in a family. A later study has suggested family Anhingidae.

References 

Prehistoric bird genera
Miocene birds of South America
Laventan
Colloncuran
Friasian
Neogene Argentina
Fossils of Argentina
Fossil taxa described in 1894
Taxa named by Florentino Ameghino